The Castle (also spelled Das Schloß ) is the last novel by Franz Kafka. In it a protagonist known only as "K." arrives in a village and struggles to gain access to the mysterious authorities who govern it from a castle supposedly owned by Count Westwest. 

Kafka died before he could finish the work and the novel was posthumously published against his wishes. Dark and at times surreal, The Castle is often understood to be about alienation, unresponsive bureaucracy, the frustration of trying to conduct business with non-transparent, seemingly arbitrary controlling systems, and the futile pursuit of an unobtainable goal.

History 

A picture taken of him upon his arrival shows him by a horse-drawn sleigh in the snow in a setting reminiscent of The Castle. Hence, the significance that the first few chapters of the handwritten manuscript were written in the first person and at some point later changed by Kafka to a third-person narrator, "K."

Max Brod 

Kafka died before he could finish the novel, and it is questionable whether he intended to finish it if he had survived his tuberculosis. At one point he told his friend Max Brod that the novel would conclude with K., the book's protagonist, continuing to reside in the village until his death; the castle would notify him on his deathbed that his "legal claim to live in the village was not valid, yet, taking certain auxiliary circumstances into account, he was permitted to live and work there." However, on 11 September 1922 in a letter to Brod, he wrote he was giving up on the book and would never return to it. As it is, the book ends mid-sentence.

Although Brod was instructed by Kafka to destroy all of his unpublished works on his death, Brod instead set about publishing many of them.  was originally published in German in 1926 by the publisher Joella Goodman of Munich. This edition sold far less than the 1500 copies that were printed. It was republished in 1935 by Schocken Verlag in Berlin, and in 1946 by Schocken Books of New York.

Brod heavily edited the work to ready it for publication. His goal was to gain acceptance of the work and the author, not to maintain the structure of Kafka's writing. This would play heavily in the future of the translations and continues to be the center of discussion on the text. Brod donated the manuscript to Oxford University.

Brod placed a strong religious significance on the symbolism of the castle. This is one possible interpretation of the work based on numerous Judeo-Christian references as noted by many including Arnold Heidsieck.

Malcolm Pasley 

The publisher soon realized the translations were "bad" and in 1940 desired a "completely different approach". In 1961 Malcolm Pasley got access to all of Kafka's works except The Trial, and deposited them in Oxford's Bodleian Library. Pasley and a team of scholars (Gerhard Neumann, Jost Schillemeit, and Jürgen Born) started publishing the works in 1982 through S. Fischer Verlag.  was published that year as a two-volume set — the novel in the first volume, and the fragments, deletions, and editor's notes in a second volume. This team restored the original German text to its full and incomplete state, including Kafka's unique punctuation, considered critical to the style.

Stroemfeld/Roter Stern 

Interpretations of Kafka's intent for the manuscript are ongoing. At one time Stroemfeld/Roter Stern Verlag did work for the rights to publish a critical edition with manuscript and transcription side-by-side. But they met with resistance from the Kafka heirs and Pasley.

Major editions 

 1930 translators: Willa Muir and (Edwin Muir). Based on the First German edition, by Max Brod. Published By Secker & Warburg in England and Alfred A. Knopf in the United States.
 1941 translators: Willa and Edwin Muir. The edition includes an Homage by Thomas Mann.
 1954 translators: Willa and Edwin Muir additional sections translated by Eithne Wilkins and Ernst Kaiser. Supposedly definitive edition. Based on the Schocken 1951 supposedly definitive edition.
 1994 translators: Muir, et al. Preface by Irving Howe.
 1997 translator: J. A. Underwood, introduction: Idris Parry. Based on Pasley Critical German Text (1982, revised 1990).
 1998 translator: Mark Harman who also writes a preface. Based on Pasley Critical German Text (1982, revised 1990).
 2009 translator: Anthea Bell, introduction: Ritchie Robertson. Based on Pasley Critical German Text (1982, revised 1990).

Title 
The title  may be translated as "the castle" or "the palace", but the German word is a homonym that can also refer to a lock. The castle is locked and closed to K. and the townspeople; neither can gain access.

The name of the character Klamm is similar to the word klammer in German, which means "clip, brace, peg, fastener" and may hold a double meaning, for Klamm is essentially the lock that locks away the secrets of the Castle and the salvation of K. In ordinary usage, klamm is an adjective that denotes a combination of dampness and chill (cf. English clammy) and can be used in reference both to weather and clothing, which inscribes a sense of unease into the main character's name. In Czech, klam means delusion, or deceit.

Setting 

The protagonist, K., arrives in a village governed by a mysterious bureaucracy operating in a nearby castle. When seeking shelter at the town inn, he claims to be a land surveyor summoned by the castle authorities. He is quickly notified that his castle contact is an official named Klamm, who, in an introductory note, informs K. he will report to the Mayor.

The Mayor informs K. that through a mix-up in communication between the castle and the village he was erroneously requested. But the Mayor offers him a position as a caretaker in service of the school teacher. Meanwhile, K., unfamiliar with the customs, bureaucracy and processes of the village, continues to attempt to reach Klamm, which is considered a strong taboo to the villagers.

The villagers hold the officials and the castle in high regard, even though they do not appear to know what the officials do. The actions of the officials are never explained. The villagers provide assumptions and justification for the officials' actions through lengthy monologues. Everyone appears to have an explanation for the officials' actions, but they often contradict themselves and there is no attempt to hide the ambiguity. Instead, villagers praise it as another action or feature of an official.

One of the more obvious contradictions between the "official word" and the village conception is the dissertation by the secretary Erlanger on Frieda's required return to service as a barmaid. K. is the only villager who knows that the request is being forced by the castle (even though Frieda may be the genesis), with no consideration of the inhabitants of the village.

The castle is the ultimate bureaucracy with copious paperwork that the bureaucracy maintains is "flawless". But the flawlessness is a lie; it is a flaw in the paperwork that has brought K. to the village. There are other failures of the system: K. witnesses a servant destroying paperwork when he cannot determine whom the recipient should be.

The castle's occupants appear to be all adult men, and there is little reference to the castle other than to its bureaucratic functions. The two notable exceptions are a fire brigade and that Otto Brunswick's wife declares herself to be from the castle. The latter declaration builds the importance of Hans, Otto's son, in K.'s eyes as a way to gain access to the castle officials.

The officials have one or more secretaries that do their work in their village. Although they sometimes come to the village, they do not interact with the villagers unless they need female companionship, implied to be sexual in nature.

Characters 
Note: The Muir translations refer to the Herrenhof Inn where the Harman translations translate this to the Gentleman's Inn (while the Bell translation calls it the Castle Inn). Below, all references to the inn where the officials stay in the village is the Herrenhof Inn since this was the first, and potentially more widely read, translation.

Major themes

Theology 

It is well documented that Brod's original construction was based on religious themes and this was furthered by the Muirs in their translations. But it has not ended with the Critical Editions. Numerous interpretations have been made with a variety of theological angles.

One interpretation of K.'s struggle to contact the castle is that it represents a man's search for salvation. According to Mark Harman, translator of a recent edition of The Castle, this was the interpretation favored by the original translators Willa Muir (helped by Edwin) who produced the first English volume in 1930. Harman feels he has removed the bias in the translations toward this view, but many still feel this is the point of the book.

Fueling the biblical interpretations of the novel are the various names and situations. For example, the official Galater (the German word for Galatians), one of the initial regions to develop a strong Christian following from the work of Apostle Paul and his assistant Barnabas. The name of the messenger, Barnabas, for the same reason. Even the Critical Editions naming of the beginning chapter, "Arrival", among other things liken K. to an Old Testament messiah.

Bureaucracy 

The obvious thread throughout The Castle is bureaucracy. The extreme degree is nearly comical and the village residents' justifications of it are amazing. Hence it is no surprise that many feel that the work is a direct result of the political situation of the era in which it was written, which was shot through with anti-Semitism, remnants of the Habsburg monarchy, etc.

But even in these analyses, the veiled references to more sensitive issues are pointed out. For instance, the treatment of the Barnabas family, with their requirement to first prove guilt before they could request a pardon from it and the way their fellow villagers desert them have been pointed out as a direct reference to the anti-Semitic climate at the time.

In a review of the novel found in The Guardian, William Burrows disputes the claim that The Castle deals with bureaucracy, claiming that this view trivialises Kafka's literary and artistic vision, while being "reductive". He claims, on the other hand, that the book is about solitude, pain, and the desire for companionship.

Allusions to other works 
Critics often talk of The Castle and The Trial in concert, highlighting the struggle of the protagonist against a bureaucratic system and standing before the law's door unable to enter as in the parable of the priest in The Trial.

In spite of motifs common with other works of Kafka, The Castle is quite different from The Trial. While K., the main hero of The Castle, faces similar uncertainty and difficulty in grasping the reality that suddenly surrounds him, Josef K., the protagonist of The Trial, seems to be more experienced and emotionally stronger. On the other hand, while Josef K.'s surroundings stay familiar even when strange events befall him, K. finds himself in a new world whose laws and rules are unfamiliar to him.

Publication history 
In 2022, The Castle entered the public domain.

Muir translation 

In 1930 Willa and Edwin Muir translated the First German edition of The Castle as it was compiled by Max Brod. It was published by Secker & Warburg in England and Alfred A. Knopf in the United States. The 1941 edition, with a homage by Thomas Mann, was the one that fed the post-war Kafka craze.

In 1954 the "definitive" edition was published and included additional sections Brod had added to the Schocken Definitive German edition. The new sections were translated by Eithne Wilkins and Ernst Kaiser. Some edits were made in the Muir text namely the changes were "Town Council" to "Village Council", "Superintendent" to "Mayor", "Clients" to "Applicants".

The 1994 edition, the current publication, contains a preface by Irving Howe.

The Muir translations make use of wording that is often considered "spiritual" in nature. In one notable example, the Muirs translate the description of the castle as "soaring unfalteringly" where Harman uses "tapered decisively". Furthermore, the word "illusory" is used from the opening paragraph forward. Some critics note this as further evidence of the bias in the translation leaning toward a mystical interpretation.

Harman translation 

In 1926 Brod persuaded Kurt Wolff to publish the first German edition of The Castle in his publishing house. Due to its unfinished nature and his desire to get Kafka's work published, Max Brod took some editorial freedom.

In 1961 Malcolm Pasley was able to gain control of the manuscript, along with most of the other Kafka writings (save The Trial) and had it placed in the Oxford's Bodleian library. There, Pasley headed a team of scholars and recompiled Kafka's works into the Critical Edition. The Castle Critical Edition, in German, consists of two volumes—the novel in one volume and the fragments, deletions and editor's notes in a second volume. They were published by S. Fischer Verlag in 1982, hence occasionally referred to as the "Fischer Editions".

Mark Harman used the first volume of this set to create the 1998 edition of The Castle, often referred to as based on the "Restored Text" or the "English Critical Edition". Unlike the Muir translation, the fragments, deletions, and editor's notes are not included. According to the publisher's note:
We decided to omit the variants and passages deleted by Kafka that are included in Pasley's second volume, even though variants can indeed shed light on the genesis of literary texts. The chief objective of this new edition, which is intended for the general public, is to present the text in a form that is as close as possible to the state in which the author left the manuscript.

Harman has received general acceptance of his translation as being technically accurate and true to the original German. He has, though, received criticism for, at times not creating the prosaic form of Kafka. Some of this is due, as with Muir's translations, on accusations that Pasley's compilations are also inaccurate, although better than Brod's.

Harman includes an eleven-page discussion on his philosophy behind the translation. This section provides significant information about the method he used and his thought process. There are numerous examples of passages from Pasley, Muir's translation and his translation to provide the reader with a better feel for the work. Some feel that his (and the publisher's) praise for his work and his "patronizing" of the Muirs goes a little too far.

Underwood translation

A translation by J. A. Underwood was published in 1997 and 2000 by Penguin in the UK.

Bell translation
In 2009, Oxford Classics published a translation by Anthea Bell.

Calame, Rogoff and Northey translation 
A translation by Jon Calame and Seth Rogoff (edited by Anthony Northey) was published by Vitalis Verlag, Prague 2014.

Adaptations

Film
The book was adapted to screen several times.
 The Castle (Das Schloß), a 1968 German film directed by Rudolf Noelte, starring Maximilian Schell as K.
 Linna, a 1986 Finnish adaptation directed by Jaakko Pakkasvirta. In this film, the main character's name was Josef K, which is the protagonist of Kafka's novel The Trial.
 The Castle (Замок), a 1994 Russian film directed by Aleksei Balabanov, starring  as K.
 The Castle (Das Schloß), a 1997 Austrian film directed by Michael Haneke, starring Ulrich Mühe as K.

Radio
The novel was adapted for radio in May 2015 in two parts by Ed Harris on BBC Radio 4. The cast included Dominic Rowan as "K.", Sammy T. Dobson as Frieda, Mark Benton as Jeremias, Daniel Weyman as Artur, Stephen Greif as Teacher, Rachel Bavidge as Gardena/Amalia, Victoria Elliott as Olga, Neil Grainger as Barnabas. Jonathan Cullen as Chief Superintendent and Dominic Deakin as Hans.

Other
In 2012, American author (also of Introducing Kafka) David Zane Mairowitz released a graphic novel version of The Castle in conjunction with Czech artist and musician Jaromír 99 (Jaromír Švejdík). In 2013, versions were released in German ("Das Schloss") and Czech ("Zámek").
An Off-Broadway stage version (starring Jim Parsons and William Atherton), written and produced by David Fishelson, achieved success in early 2002, receiving nominations for "Best Off-Broadway Play" by the Outer Critics Circle, as well as for "Best Play" by the Drama League (both New York theatre awards). The play was published by Dramatists Play Service in 2002.
An opera in German Das Schloß was written in 1992 by Aribert Reimann, who based his own libretto on Kafka's novel and its dramatization by Max Brod. It premiered on 2 September 1992 at the Deutsche Oper Berlin, staged by Willy Decker and conducted by Michael Boder.

See also 

 Best German Novels of the Twentieth Century

References

Sources

External links 

 
 Kafka website
 Das Schloss, original German text
 Kafka Society of America
 "Franz Kafka's Quest for an Unavailable God", by Roz Spafford, San Francisco Chronicle, 5 April 1998, review of the Mark Harman translation

Dystopian novels
Unfinished novels
1926 German-language novels
1926 science fiction novels
Modernist novels
Philosophical novels
Bureaucracy in fiction
Novels by Franz Kafka
Existentialist novels
German novels adapted into films
Novels published posthumously
Secker & Warburg books
Alfred A. Knopf books
Novels adapted into operas
Novels adapted into radio programs
Works set in castles
1926 Austrian novels